Lisa Albrecht (27 May 1896 – 16 May 1958) was a German politician of the Social Democratic Party (SPD) and former member of the German Bundestag.

Life 
Albrecht had been a member of the SPD since 1914. In 1946/47, she was state chairwoman of the SPD in Bavaria, then deputy state chairwoman until her death. From 1947 until her death Albrecht was a member of the federal executive committee of the SPD. Lisa Albrecht was a member of the German Bundestag from the first federal election in 1949 until her death.

Literature

References

1896 births
1958 deaths
Members of the Bundestag for Bavaria
Members of the Bundestag 1957–1961
Members of the Bundestag 1953–1957
Members of the Bundestag 1949–1953
Female members of the Bundestag
20th-century German women politicians
Members of the Bundestag for the Social Democratic Party of Germany